England under Elizabeth I's reign, the Elizabethan Era, was ruled by the very structured and complicated Elizabethan government. It was divided into the national bodies (the monarch, Privy Council, and Parliament), the regional bodies (the Council of the North and Council of the Marches), the county, community bodies and the court system.

Structure

National bodies

Privy Council 
The Privy Council was Elizabeth's group of advisers. Its main purpose was to give numerous different opinions and the monarch decided on the issue at hand. (However, the advice was often ignored; the Council still carried out her wishes.) Routine administration was usually left to the Council. It was involved in matters of religion, military, the queen's security, economics, and the welfare of the citizens. It dealt with national and individual interest matters, issued proclamations in the queen's name, and supervised law and enforcement.

The Council could make decisions, but the monarch could veto (turn down or overturn) anything without question. Who was in it depended on who the queen wanted there. However, certain powerful noblemen were necessary for the Council so that their and their realms' interests were represented to avoid a rebellion. Believing that more members (and therefore more different opinions) would cause more problems, Elizabeth dropped the previous member count of 50 to 19 and eventually 11 by 1597. The Counsellors employed assistants who did most of the work. At first, they met only 3 times a week; by the end of Elizabeth's reign, they met almost every day.

The Secretary of State led the Council. William Cecil effectively led it; he was wise, cautious, cooperative with Elizabeth, and trusted above all others. Elizabeth's personal secretary, and chief adviser until his death, and therefore very influential; due to his great administrative ability, he had the reputation of one of the greatest English statesmen – historians have even debated whether the success of Elizabeth's rule was more due to William Cecil or Elizabeth. His son, Robert Cecil, was also a member of Queen Elizabeth's Privy council.

Parliament 
The group of representatives, called Parliament, was divided into the House of Lords (or the Upper House), which consisted of nobility and higher clergy such as bishops and archbishops, and the House of Commons (or the Lower House), which consisted of common people. Unlike the modern British Parliament, it had much less power, no Prime Minister or cabinet, and no political parties.

The main function of Parliament was dealing with financial matters (taxation and granting the queen money). Generally, the monarch paid for daily administration with ordinary revenues (customs, feudal dues, and sales of land) while Parliament covered extraordinary expenditures (such as war) with taxation. However, taxation didn't supply enough for military expenditures; therefore, more land was sold along with probably illegal scheming. Parliament was also used for passing laws. 438 laws were passed under Elizabeth's reign. They were either public, in which case they applied to all, or private, in which case they only applied to certain people. Only another Parliament could undo one. They required approval by both houses thrice and the queen. However, the queen could make Royal Proclamations without Parliament's consent. Another purpose of Parliament was to advise. Nonetheless, Elizabeth was almost never interested in Parliament's advice.

Elections occurred only for the House of Commons. Who was in Parliament depended mainly on who was supported by the important local people. Only those that were male and received a certain annual income could vote.

The monarch decided when Parliament was to be called. In total, Elizabeth only called Parliament thirteen times, 11 of which were to ask for money.

Local governments 
Local governments were important in Tudor England. Regional governments helped oversee parts of England that the Privy Council could not supervise. The Council of the North, which resided in York, oversaw Northern England, while the Council of the Marches, which resided in Ludlow, oversaw Wales and some border counties.

Royal representatives (Justices of the Peace, Sheriffs, and Lords Lieutenant) were appointed in every county; they ensured that the queen's commands and laws were obeyed. Each city and town had its own government, headed by a mayor as well.

Manors were run by nobility and gentry. Land was power at the time; those with land received payments from the tenants on their land and from their workers. Thus they had significant wealth and influence. They also had responsibilities, for they were meant to aid the monarch by governing their land. Local grievances were taken to the lord of the manor; on the other hand, tenants were loyal to him – if called upon, they were obliged to go to war. The lord's views tended to greatly influence those of his largely uneducated tenants.

Courts 
The courts made up the judicial system of Elizabethan England. The most important courts were the Great Sessions Courts or the Assizes, which were held twice a year in each county, and the Quarter Sessions Courts, which were held four times in a year. These two dealt with most crimes. The Assizes was famous for its power to inflict harsh punishments.

Unimportant crimes were handled by the Petty Sessions Courts, Manor Courts, and town courts. Civil cases were dealt with by various courts, depending on the person's monetary status; the wealthy were tried by the Star Chamber, one of the highest profile courts which consisted of mostly Privy Counselors. The Court of Chancery also judged criminal cases, the Exchequer of Pleas dealt with financial suits, the Court of Requests with the poor ("the court of the poor man’s causes," as it was known), Church Courts with religious and moral cases, and other specific courts with other specific matters.

Committers of high treason and other serious crimes received the death sentence (often handled by the queen). Often a violent death sentence in the case of high treason involving being hanged, drawn and quartered; that is, hanged, taken down before dead, dragged face downward through the streets, and then hacked into four pieces, or quartered, only to have the remains displayed in a public place to discourage others from committing treason. Those of lesser crimes were sent to prison or the stocks. Uses of the pillory, ducking stool, the brank, the drunkards cloak, burning, the breaking wheel, and other forms of punishment and torture were also common during this time.

Domestic policy 

A strict aristocracy helped Elizabeth maintain the dominance of her reign. She also had thousands of guards enforcing the city and the castle in case of any riots. If riots were to happen, there would be fireballs made of rock strewn and shot at the rioters.

Foreign policy 
Elizabethan government concerning foreign policy is often accused of being affected by factionalism. This appears true in the later part of her reign, post-Armada, when factions led by the Earl of Essex, and the Cecils, argued over which way the war against Spain should proceed. Essex, keen for glory and prestige, favored an expensive land based military strategy, whilst the Cecil faction advocated a cheaper moderate naval strategy. Due to the conflicting factions no policy was explicitly followed and each side frequently tried to undermine the others, resulting in a confused foreign policy.

Faction pre-Armada is harder to analyze. The traditional view put forward by Read and Neale, suggests that William Cecil (later Lord Burghley) was continually in faction against Robert Dudley, over issues such as marriage and most importantly intervention in the Netherlands. Revisionist historian Adams defines faction as "one group of people employed in direct opposition to another." It is on this premise that historians such as John Guy argue there was no true faction in the Council at this stage, disagreements were primarily over individual opinions, and judgements over how to proceed; all councillors, after the removal of conservative Norfolk, were agreed that Elizabeth should look to further and protect the Protestant cause. Leicester and Walsingham saw intervention in the Netherlands as the best way to achieve this, whilst Cecil was more moderate.

Impact 
The Elizabethan Era is famous for its playwrights (William Shakespeare, Christopher Marlowe, and Ben Jonson) that thrived during this period; Francis Drake, the first Englishman to circumnavigate the world; and Walter Raleigh's exploration of the New World. The stability and structure of the government helped to allow the arts to flourish and prompted other achievements in exploration.

References

Works cited 

 
 
 
 
 
 
 
 

Government of England
Elizabeth I